Cornell Heights Historic District is a national historic district located in Ithaca, New York. The district contains 208 contributing buildings and one contributing site.  It consists of an early 20th-century residential subdivision developed between 1898 and 1942, and originally conceived as a "residence park" for faculty members of Cornell University, directly north of the Fall Creek gorge.

It was listed on the National Register of Historic Places in 1989.

Carl Sagan's former house, a converted 1926 Egyptian Revival building perched halfway down the cliff of Fall Creek gorge, is a contributing building of the district.

References

Historic districts on the National Register of Historic Places in New York (state)
Historic districts in Tompkins County, New York
National Register of Historic Places in Tompkins County, New York